Aishath Saffa (born ) is a Maldivian volleyball and beach volleyball player, playing as an outside hitter. She was part of the Maldives women's national volleyball team.

She participated at the 2010 Asian Games. On club level she played for Dhivehi Sifainge in 2010.

As a beach volleyball player she played together with Yumna Abdul Azeez in 2010, and competed at the 2010 Asian Beach Games.

References

1989 births
Living people
Maldivian women's volleyball players
Volleyball players at the 2010 Asian Games
Place of birth missing (living people)
Maldivian beach volleyball players
Asian Games competitors for the Maldives